Ken Kelly may refer to:

Ken Kelly (artist) (1946–2022), American fantasy artist
Ken Kelly (rugby league) (born 1952), English rugby league footballer
Kenny Kelly (born 1979), American baseball player
Kenneth Kelly (1905–1984), American football, basketball, and tennis player and coach
Kenneth Kelly, a fictional child character in Barney & Friends

See also
 Ken Kelley (disambiguation)